USS Pequot (ID-2998) was a German cargo steamship that the US Government seized in 1917 after the US entry into the First World War. She briefly served in the Naval Overseas Transportation Service. In 1923 her original owner, DDG Hansa, chartered her and then bought her back.

The ship was launched in 1910 as Ockenfels, and was the second of three DDG Hansa ships to bear that name. She was one of a series of eight sister ships built for DDG Hansa. The others were Birkenfels and Freienfels launched in 1910, Kandelfels, Sturmfels and Huberfels launched in 1912 and Lauterfels and Spitzfels launched in 1913.

She is the second ship to serve as USS Pequot. The first  was a gunboat in the American Civil War.

In 1921 DDG Hansa took delivery of a new Ockenfels. Therefore when the company bought back Pequot in 1923 it gave her the new name Argenfels.

Building
Joh. C. Tecklenborg built Ockenfels in Geestemünde, which is now part of Bremerhaven. She was launched on 9 April 1920 and completed on 28 May. For handling cargo she had one 25-ton derrick, eight five-ton derricks and three three-ton derricks.

Service history

On 1 August 1914 after the First World War began Ockenfels was interned in Boston. On 6 April 1917 after the USA entered the First World War the US Government seized her in New York City. However, her German crew sabotaged her main engine and repairs were not completed until late in 1918.

The US Shipping Board bareboat chartered the ship to the US Navy. She was defensively armed with one  gun and one  gun. On 28 October 1918 the ship was commissioned as USS Pequot under the command of Lt Cdr John Decry, USNR. A fortnight later the Armistice of 11 November 1918 ended the war.

Pequot served in the Naval Overseas Transportation Service carrying general cargo for both the US Army and the US Shipping Board. On 11 July 1919 she was struck from the Navy List and returned to the Shipping Board.

In 1923 the California Steamship Company bought Pequot, registered her in Panama and almost immediately chartered her to DDG Hansa. On 28 June 1923 she was in Cardiff, Wales when DDG Hansa bought her back.

By then DDG Hansa had a new Ockenfels so it renamed her Argenfels. She spent a decade in DDG Hansa service and was sold for scrap in 1932.

References

Bibliography

External links
 
 

1910 ships
Cargo ships of the United States Navy
Ships built in Bremen (state)
Steamships of Germany
Steamships of the United States
World War I merchant ships of Germany